Ayo H. Kimathi (born December 2, 1973) is a Black nationalist, anti-LGBT activist, and international lecturer. Born in Southeast Greater Community hospital, he spent his early life in Southeast Washington, D.C., where he became interested in Black history and racial politics. He is most known for his opposition to homosexuality and pedophilia in the Black world community and his openly expressed animus towards white supremacy. The title he goes by when lecturing is the "Irritated Genie of Soufeese." His website has endorsed the killing of whites and "black traitors". At one point it held an "enemies list" which included Rev.Al Sharpton, Lil Wayne, Oprah Winfrey, Whoopi Goldberg, Condoleezza Rice, Colin Powell and Barack Obama.

In July 2009, Kimathi began working in government contracting at Immigration Customs Enforcement (ICE) as a Small Business Specialist. On August 21, 2013, his identity as a Black Nationalist leader who spoke out vocally against homosexuality in the Black community was exposed in an online article from The Wire. Once news of this article spread to mainstream news networks such as CNN, FOX News, Huffington Post. Kimathi was put on paid leave and eventually fired in December 2013.

In 2015, Kimathi was elected International Spokesman of a newly created movement called the Straight Black Pride Movement (SBPM). In the same year, he was officially banned from the country of Bermuda for a lecture he did stating among other things that, "Black men should only date and marry Black women." Based on his adamant stance against homosexuality, interracial dating and marriage, and sex, the Home Affairs Minister for Bermuda, Michael Fahy, banned Ayo Kimathi from Bermuda for at least (5) years in 2015.

Work life 

In 1995, Kimathi took a job as a Small Business Specialist for the Department of the Navy. He worked there until 2003 when he quit to write the book, 'War on the Horizon -Black Resistance to the white-sex Assault' which he self-published in 2005. In 2009, after 6 years doing lectures and acting as a part-time real estate agent, Kimathi returned to the U.S. Government Immigration Customs Enforcement (ICE) in the capacity of assisting small businesses in winning contracts. He was eventually fired in December 2013 for his lecture work done under the pseudonym "Irritated Genie of Soufeese." The 'Irritated Genie' is the title of a book authored by Jacob Carruthers and it refers to the spirit of the Black people who fought in the Haitian Revolution. 'Soufeese' is a take-off of the region of Washington, D.C., where Kimathi grew up, Southeast.

In August 2015, he joined a newly formed movement called the Straight Black Pride Movement (SBPM). In September 2015, Kimathi traveled to Bermuda to perform his Effeminization of the Black Male lecture. In this lecture, Effeminization of the Black Male in Bermuda, he spoke to the audience about the SBPM. As a result of this lecture, the Minister of Home Affairs for Bermuda, Michael Fahy, officially banned the Ayo Kimathi from the country for 5 years. On December 18, 2015, the Human Rights Commission of Bermuda submitted Kimathi a complaint about the lecture he gave in Bermuda where he stated that Black men should only date and marry Black women and that homosexuality originated from white Europeans along with other forms of “sexual deviance” including child molestation, bestiality and rape.

References 

1973 births
American activists
American conspiracy theorists
Hampton University alumni
Hate speech
Living people
People from Washington, D.C.